Ubaye-Serre-Ponçon (Vivaro-Alpine: Ubaia e La Sèrra de Ponçon) is a commune in the department of Alpes-de-Haute-Provence, southeastern France. It was formed on 1 January 2017 from the merger of the former communes of La Bréole (the seat) and Saint-Vincent-les-Forts.

See also 
Communes of the Alpes-de-Haute-Provence department

References 

Communes of Alpes-de-Haute-Provence
Communes nouvelles of Alpes-de-Haute-Provence
Populated places established in 2017
2017 establishments in France